Shotor Khan may refer to:
 Shotor Khun, Kohgiluyeh and Boyer-Ahmad
 Shotor Khan, Tehran